Another Fall from Grace is the eleventh studio album by The Mission released on 30 September 2016. Wayne Hussey has described the album as a lost link between The Sisters of Mercy's First and Last and Always album and The Mission's own first album, God's Own Medicine. He attributes this in part to his use of the 12-string guitar which he fell out of favour with after God's Own Medicine was released.

Track listing
All songs were written by Wayne Hussey, except tracks 1,5,9 written by Simon Hinkler and Wayne Hussey

"Another Fall from Grace"
"Met-Amor-Phosis"
"Within the Deepest Darkness (Fearful)"
"Blood on the Road"
"Can't See the Ocean for the Rain"
"Tyranny of Secrets"
"Never's Longer Than Forever"
"Bullets & Bayonets"
"Valaam"
"Jade"
"Only You & You Alone"
"Phantom Pain"

Personnel

The Mission 
 Wayne Hussey – guitars, vocals
 Simon Hinkler – guitars, keyboards
 Craig Adams – bass
 Mike Kelly - drums

Additional personnel 
 Wayne Hussey – production
 Tim Palmer – production, mixing (at 62 Studios, Austin, Texas), rabble backing vocals on track 7
 Julianne Regan - additional vocals on tracks 1, 12
 Ville Valo – additional vocals on track 2
 Gary Numan – additional vocals on track 3
 Evi Vine – additional vocals on tracks 5, 7
 Martin Gore - backing vocals on track 11
 George D. Allen - Hammond organ and rabble backing vocals on track 7
 Stevie Vine - additional sonic guitar on track 7
 Veronica, Sarah Dean – rabble backing vocals on track 7
 Duke Garwood - alto clarinet and alto saxophone on track 12

References

2016 albums
The Mission (band) albums
Albums produced by Tim Palmer